The 2014 Women's EuroHockey Indoor Nations Championship - Division III was the lowest division of EuroHockey Indoor Nations Championship, that was played on January 24–26, 2014 in Poreč, Croatia. The winner got promoted to 2016 Women's EuroHockey Indoor Nations Championship - Division II.

Results

Group stage

Bronze final

Gold final

Final ranking

References

2014
International women's field hockey competitions hosted by Croatia
2014 in Croatian women's sport
2014 in women's field hockey
WOmen 3